Stevan Andrija Mićić (born 4 April 1996) is a Serbian-American freestyle and folkstyle wrestler who competes at 57 kilograms (125 pounds). He won a bronze medal at the 2022 World Wrestling Championships in Belgrade, Serbia. He is the first wrestler representing Serbia to win a medal in men's freestyle wrestling at the World Wrestling Championships.

He has also claimed two bronze medals at the European Championships (2018 and 2020), a silver medal at the 2019 European Games, and bronze medals at the Mediterranean Games (2018 and 2022) while representing Serbia. In college, he is a three-time NCAA Division I All-American and the '18 Big Ten Conference champion for the Michigan Wolverines.

Biography

Background
Stevan Mićić was born on April 4, 1996, in Mesa, Arizona, United States, to parents Stevan and Lori Mićić. In his early years, Stevan grew up in Northwest Indiana within the Serbian culture, an area within the Chicago metropolitan area, which has one of the largest Serbian populations outside of Serbia.

High School Career
Stevan graduated from Hanover Central High School in Cedar Lake, Indiana in 2014.  He was named the 2014 Indiana state recipient of the Dave Schultz High School Excellence Award. He is a three-time Indiana state champion, winning at 126 pounds (2014), 113 pounds (2013) and 106 pounds (2012) and finished third at 103 pounds as a freshman (2011). Stevan graduated with a career prep record of 184-5, including a perfect 141-0 mark over his final three seasons. He was anked as the nation's No. 19 overall recruit by InterMat and No. 1-ranked 126-pound wrestler.

College career
He is a student of the University of Michigan and runner-up at the NCAA national championships in 2018.

At the end of 2018, he had a collegiate wrestling record 74 wins and 13 defeats. At the 2019 NCAA national championships in the quarterfinal he beat Iowa Wrestler, Austin DeSanto, in a close match by score (3-2).

For the 2019–20 season, Mićić did not compete after qualifying for the Olympics through his finish at the 2019 World Championships, utilizing an Olympic redshirt. He planned to return in 2021 with one year of eligibility remaining, despite not competing during regular season, but pulled out of the 2021 NCAA Championships due to an injury.

International career
Mićić wrestled for the United States at junior levels, winning a bronze medal at 55 kg at the 2015 Junior World Championships in Salvador, Brazil. From 2018, he started to represent Serbia at senior levels. Mićić holds dual citizenship and chose to compete for the birth country of his father. He participated in the 2018 European Wrestling Championships, held in Kaspiysk, Dagestan, Russia where he lost to Zaur Uguev of Russia, but went on to wrestle back and win a bronze medal after defeating Levan Vartanov of Spain. The bronze medal was also Serbia's first ever European medal in freestyle wrestling. Later at the 2018 Mediterranean Games in Tarragona, Spain, Mićić took another bronze medal at 65 kg. At the 2019 European Games, he won a silver medal, defeating world No.1 Süleyman Atlı of Turkey and U23 world bronze medallist Taras Markovych of Ukraine en route.

Mićić qualified for the 2020 Summer Olympics by finishing in fifth place at the 2019 World Wrestling Championships in Kazakhstan, where he lost 5–4 in a tight quarterfinal match against Süleyman Atlı and later lost 4–3 in a bronze medal match against host country's Nurislam Sanayev. However, winning the 2021 Poland Open Ranking Series event helped Mićić to be the top seed at the Tokyo Olympics.

He won one of the bronze medals in the 65 kg event at the 2022 Mediterranean Games held in Oran, Algeria. He won one of the bronze medals in the 57kg event at the 2022 World Wrestling Championships held in Belgrade, Serbia.

References

External links 
 

1996 births
Living people
Sportspeople from Mesa, Arizona
American people of Serbian descent
Serbian male sport wrestlers
Mediterranean Games bronze medalists for Serbia
Mediterranean Games medalists in wrestling
Competitors at the 2018 Mediterranean Games
Competitors at the 2022 Mediterranean Games
Wrestlers at the 2019 European Games
European Games medalists in wrestling
European Games silver medalists for Serbia
Michigan Wolverines wrestlers
European Wrestling Championships medalists
World Wrestling Championships medalists
Wrestlers at the 2020 Summer Olympics
Olympic wrestlers of Serbia